Rattanakosin is the period of Thai history since 1782, represented by the Rattanakosin Kingdom.

Rattanakosin may also refer to:
The city of Bangkok during this period; see History of Bangkok
Rattanakosin Island, the historic center of Bangkok
Rattanakosin style (or Bangkok style), a distinct period in Thai art